Bobbysocks! was the first album from Norwegian pop duo Bobbysocks!. The album was released in 1984 and in a new version in 1985. The re-release became popular in many parts of the world, and by early 1986 the album had sold around 75,000 copies in Norway. In 2012, the album reached viral popularity when popular YouTube user Nigahiga featured the track "Don't Bring Lulu" in one of his videos. Album sales are estimated to have been at least 12,000 in the following month alone.

Track listing (1984 version)
Side 1:
"In the Mud" 
"Farewell Blues" 
"In the Mood" 
"Midnight Rocks" 
"Radio" 
"Don't Bring Lulu" 
"Little by Little" - Elisabeth 
"Shoo-shoo-baby"

Side 2:
"Adios" - Hanne
"Cross Over the Bridge" 
"I don't Wanna Break my Heart" 
"The booglie-wooglie Piggy" 
"Go on Shakin'"

Track listing (1985 version)
Side 1
Let It Swing (La det swinge)
Midnight Rocks
Radio
Don't Bring Lulu
Little by Little 
Shoo-shoo-baby

Side 2
Adios 
Cross Over the Bridge
I Don't Wanna Break my Heart
The Booglie-Wooglie Piggy
Go on Shakin'

Charts
Album

Single

References 

Bobbysocks! albums
1984 debut albums